The men's curling at the 2007 Asian Winter Games was held from January 29 to February 1, 2007 at Changchun Municipal Skating Rink, China.

Squads

Results
All times are China Standard Time (UTC+08:00)

Preliminary

 Draw challenge: KOR 197.3 cm, JPN 302.7 cm, CHN 358.6 cm
29 January, 9:30

29 January, 15:30

30 January, 9:30

30 January, 15:30

31 January, 9:30

31 January, 15:30

Final round

Semifinal
1 February, 9:00

Gold medal match
1 February, 14:30

References

Session 1
Session 2
Session 3
Session 4
Session 5
Session 6
Semifinal
Final

External links
Official website

Men